Lurie Preston Poston (born September 30, 1996) is an American actor and singer.

Poston began his career in the cast of the Broadway Musical Chitty Chitty Bang Bang, acting in over 300 performances. In 2003, he had a small part playing Young Varla in the film Girls Will Be Girls. He also appeared in Walk Hard: The Dewey Cox Story (2007), played Tommy Huff in Step Brothers (2008), and Knucklehead (2010); and had a starring role as Joshua Dowd in James Vasquez's 2008 award-winning feature film Ready? OK!, with Carrie Preston and Michael Emerson.

In November 2011, Poston guest-starred in the season finale of the television show Workaholics, playing Damien Carmichael. He also played Trevor in the 2014 Kickin' It episode "Martinez & Malone: Mall Cops!".

Poston graduated from the University of Southern California in 2019.

Filmography

References

External link
 Lurie Poston on IMDb

1996 births
American male child actors
21st-century American male actors
Living people